Amy MacMahon (born 7 June 1986) is a member of the Legislative Assembly of Queensland representing the Greens for the seat of South Brisbane. She has experience as a teacher and sociologist, holding several degrees including a PhD from the University of Queensland (UQ).

At the 2020 state election, MacMahon won the seat of South Brisbane from Labor's Jackie Trad, becoming the second Greens member in parliament alongside Michael Berkman.

Personal life and education 
MacMahon lives in East Brisbane, and went to Brisbane State High School. In 2011, MacMahon spent 12 months in Bangladesh completing some community work. She currently holds a Bachelor of Arts and Bachelor of Social Science, as well as a Doctorate of Philosophy from UQ. The thesis for her PhD investigated climate change adaptation in Bangladesh.

Career 
MacMahon has most recently worked with Ipswich City Council on community engagement. Before that, she worked as an English teacher, and a sociology lecturer at UQ.

2020 Queensland state election 

At the 2020 state election, MacMahon defeated Labor's former deputy premier Jackie Trad for the seat of South Brisbane, achieving 37.9 per cent of the primary vote, overtaking Trad on 34.4 per cent. MacMahon received a two-candidate-preferred vote of 55.3 per cent once preferences had been delivered. This followed a decision by the LNP to recommend Labor be preferenced last in South Brisbane. She became the second Greens member currently in the state parliament, with Berkman in the seat of Maiwar.

MacMahon also contested against Trad in South Brisbane during the 2017 election, achieving 34.4 per cent of primary votes and 46.4 per cent after preferences.

References 

1986 births
21st-century Australian politicians
Australian Greens members of the Parliament of Queensland
Living people
Members of the Queensland Legislative Assembly
People educated at Brisbane State High School
Women members of the Queensland Legislative Assembly
21st-century Australian women politicians